The Battle of Kharda also known as Battle of Khurla took place in 1795 between Nizam and Maratha Empire, in which Nizam was badly defeated.

During the Battle 
Governor General John Shore followed the policy of non-intervention despite that Nizam was under his protection. So this led to the loss of trust with the British. This was the last battle fought together by all the Maratha chiefs under leadership of Parshurambhau Patwardhan. Maratha forces consisted of cavalry, including gunners, bowmen, artillery and infantry.

After several skirmishes Nizams infantry under Raymond launched an attack on the Marathas but Scindia forces under Jivabadada Kerkar defeated them and launched a counter attack which proved to be decisive. The rest of the Hyderabad army fled to the fort of Kharda. The Nizam started negotiations and they were concluded in April 1795.

Aftermath 
Chimnaji Phatak, his son Balkrishna Phatak, Balkrishna Latey were among those who served the Peshwa's camp during the war.

Notes

Further reading 

Conflicts in 1795
Battles involving the Maratha Empire